This is a list of association football families in Europe. The countries are listed according to the national teams of the senior family member if the other family member played for a different country. If the senior members of the given member did not play international football, the family will be listed according to nationality (e.g., the Trézéguets).

 Families included on the list must have

 at least, one member of the family is capped by a national team on the senior level or an important person in the game of football (e.g., notable coaches, referees, club chairmen, etc.)
 a second member must be a professional player or capped by a national team on the senior level.

Albania 

 Arlind Ajeti,  Adonis Ajeti (brother),  Albian Ajeti (brother/Adonis's twin)
 Migjen Basha, Vullnet Basha (brother)
 Agim Cana, Lorik Cana (son)
 Armend Dallku,  Ardin Dallku (brother)
 Klodian Duro, Albert Duro (brother)
 Jürgen Gjasula, Klaus Gjasula (brother)
 Ali Mema, Osman Mema (brother), Ardian Mema (son), Sulejman Mema (nephew)
 Besnik Prenga, Herdi Prenga (son)
 Foto Strakosha, Thomas Strakosha (son),  Dhimitri Strakosha (son)
 Taulant Xhaka,  Granit Xhaka (brother) Armando Sadiku (cousin)

Andorra 

 Koldo Álvarez, Iker Álvarez (son)
 Ariana Gonçalves, Bibiana Gonçalves (sister)
 Antoni Lima, Ildefons Lima (brother)

Armenia 
Arman Karamyan, Artavazd Karamyan (twin brother)
 Ruslan Koryan,  Arshak Koryan (cousin)
Hamlet Mkhitaryan, Henrikh Mkhitaryan (son)
Ivan Yagan,  Ben Yagan (brother)
Artur Yedigaryan, Artak Yedigaryan (brother)

Austria 

 Goran Djuricin, Marco Djuricin (son)
 Wolfgang Feiersinger, Laura Feiersinger (daughter)
 Rudi Flögel, Thomas Flögel (son)
 Werner Gregoritsch, Michael Gregoritsch (son)
 Ralph Hasenhüttl, Patrick Hasenhüttl (son)
 Erich Hof, Norbert Hof (brother)
 Robert Ibertsberger, Andreas Ibertsberger (brother)
 , Andreas Ivanschitz (brother)
 , Reinhard Kienast (brother), Roman Kienast (son of Wolfgang)
 Wolfgang Knaller, Walter Knaller (brother), Marco Knaller (son)
 Robert Körner, Alfred Körner (brother)
 Ernst Kozlicek, Paul Kozlicek (brother)
 Dejan Ljubicic, Robert Ljubičić (brother)
 Willy Meisl, Hugo Meisl (brother)
 Andreas Ogris, Ernst Ogris (brother)
 Sebastian Prödl, Viktoria Schnaderbeck (cousin), David Schnaderbeck (cousin and brother of Viktoria),
 Herfried Sabitzer, Marcel Sabitzer (son), Thomas Sabitzer (nephew)
 Walter Schachner, Alexander Schachner (son)
 , Marko Stanković (son)
 Pascal Stöger, Kevin Stöger (brother)
 Ivica Vastić, Toni Vastić (son)
 Thomas Weissenberger, Markus Weissenberger (brother), Philipp Weissenberger (brother)
 Robert Žulj, Peter Žulj (brother)

Azerbaijan 
 Rufat Dadashov, Renat Dadaşov (brother)
 Isgandar Javadov, Vagif Javadov, Ilgar Gurbanov (nephews)
 Ozan Kökçü,  Orkun Kökçü

Belarus 

 Alexander Hleb, Vyacheslav Hleb (brother)
 Mikhail Markhel, Yuri Markhel (brother)

Belgium 

 Michy Batshuayi, Aaron Leya Iseka (brother)
 Christian Benteke, Jonathan Benteke (brother)
 Gilbert Bodart, Arnaud Bodart (nephew)
 Pierre Braine, Raymond Braine (brother)
 Leander Dendoncker, Lars Dendoncker (brother)
 Jean-François De Sart, Julien De Sart, Alexis De Sart (sons)
 Marc Emmers, Xian Emmers (son)
 Faris Haroun (see  Kévin Nicaise)
 Thierry Hazard, Carine Hazard (wife), Eden Hazard, Thorgan Hazard, Kylian Hazard (sons)
 Vincent Kompany, François Kompany (brother)
 Stallone Limbombe, Anthony Limbombe, Bryan Limbombe (brothers)
 Romelu Lukaku, Jordan Lukaku (see  Roger Lukaku)
 Marc Millecamps, Luc Millecamps (brother)
 Mbo Mpenza, Émile Mpenza (brother)
 Radja Nainggolan, Riana Nainggolan (twin sister)
 Divock Origi (see  Mike Origi)
 Tristan Peersman, Kjell Peersman (son)
 Albert Sambi Lokonga (see  Paul-José M'Poku)
 Hippolyte van den Bosch, Pieter van den Bosch (brother)
 Erwin Vandenbergh, Kevin Vandenbergh (son)
 Stan Vanden Eynde, Jack Van den Eynde (brother)
 François Van der Elst, Leo Van der Elst (brother)
 Marcel Van Vye, Eric Van Vyve (son), Sven Vermant (son-in-law of Eric), Romeo Vermant (great-grandson, son of Sven)
 Jan Verheyen, Gert Verheyen (son)
 Dany Verlinden, Thibaud Verlinden (son)
 Marc Wilmots, Reno Wilmots, Marten Wilmots (sons)

Bosnia and Herzegovina

Bulgaria 

 Sasho Angelov, Valeri Bojinov (stepson)
 Daniel Borimirov, Aleks Borimirov (son)
 Iliya Gruev, Ilia Gruev (son)
 Petar Hubchev, Hristofor Hubchev (nephew)
 Ivan Kolev, Todor Kolev (brother)
 Svetoslav Kovachev, Lachezar Kovachev (brother)
 Nikolay Krastev, Dimo Krastev (son)
 Biser Mihaylov, Borislav Mihaylov (son), Nikolay Mihaylov (son of Borislav)
 Veselin Minev, Yordan Minev (twin brother)
 Dimitar Penev, Lyuboslav Penev (nephew)
 Milen Petkov, Aleks Petkov (son)

Croatia

Cyprus 
 Siniša Gogić, Alexandaros Gogić (son)
 Milenko Špoljarić, Alexander Špoljarić, Matija Špoljarić, Danilo Špoljarić (sons)
 Demetris Stylianou, Loukas Stylianou (twin brother)

Czech Republic 

 Kamila Dubcová, Michaela Dubcová (twin sister)
 Martin Frýdek Sr., Martin Frýdek Jr., Christián Frýdek (sons)
 Michal Hubník, Roman Hubník (brother)
 Karel Jarolím, Lukáš Jarolím, David Jarolím (sons), Marek Jarolím (nephew)
 Miroslav Kadlec, Michal Kadlec (son)
 Ján Kozák Sr.,  Ján Kozák Jr. (son)
 Radoslav Látal, Radek Látal (son)
 Tomáš Necid, Simona Necidová (sister)
 Jiří Rosický Sr., Jiří Rosický Jr., Tomáš Rosický (sons)
 René Twardzik,  Dan Twardzik (son), Filip Twardzik, Patrik Twardzik (twin sons)
 Alexander Vencel Sr.,  Alexander Vencel Jr. (son)
 Ladislav Vízek, Vladimír Šmicer (son-in-law)
 Lucie Voňková (see  Mary van der Meer)
 Čestmír Vycpálek, Zdeněk Zeman (nephew)
 Vladimír Weiss I,  Vladimír Weiss II (son),  Vladimír Weiss III (grandson)

Denmark 

 Daniel Agger, Nicolaj Agger (cousin)
 Henrik Andersen,  Kristoffer Andersen (son)
 Ove Flindt Bjerg, Christian Flindt Bjerg (son)
 Jan Bjur, Ole Bjur (brother), Peter Bjur (son)
 Christian Eriksen, Louise Eriksen (sister)
 Henrik Jensen, Thomas Delaney (son-in-law), Mike Jensen (son)
 Niclas Jensen, Daniel Jensen (brother)
 Finn Laudrup, Ebbe Skovdahl (brother-in-law), Michael Laudrup (son), Brian Laudrup (son), Nicolai Laudrup (grandson/Brian's son), Mads Laudrup (grandson/Michael's son), Andreas Laudrup (grandson/Michael's son)
 Jan Mølby, Johnny Mølby (cousin)
 Lars Olsen, Ricki Olsen (son)
 Poul Pedersen, Viktor Fischer (grandson)
 Ebbe Sand, Peter Sand (twin brother), Emil Sand (Peter's son)
 Peter Schmeichel, Kasper Schmeichel (son)
 Kim Vilfort, Kasper Vilfort (nephew)

England

Estonia 

 Henri Anier, Hannes Anier (brother)
 Liis Emajõe, Riin Emajõe (sister)
 Enver Jääger, Enar Jääger (brother)
 Risto Kallaste, Ken Kallaste (son)
 Dzintar Klavan, Ragnar Klavan (son)
 Evald Mikson,  Jóhannes Eðvaldsson (son),  Atli Eðvaldsson (son),  Sif Atladóttir (granddaughter, Atli's daughter)
 Henrik Ojamaa, Hindrek Ojamaa (brother)
 Mart Poom, Markus Poom (son)
 Eino Puri, Sander Puri (twin brother)
 Sergei Ratnikov, Eduard Ratnikov and Daniil Ratnikov (sons)

Faroe Islands 

 Rannvá Biskopstø Andreasen, Ragna Biskopstø Patawary (twin sister)
 Jens Martin Knudsen, Petur Knudsen (son)

Finland 

 Göran Enckelman, Peter Enckelman (son)
 Rainer Forss, Tero Forss (son), Marcus Forss (grandson, son of Tero)
 Përparim Hetemaj,  Mehmet Hetemaj (brother)
 Lukáš Hrádecký, Tomas Hradecký (brother), Matej Hradecky (brother)
 Atik Ismail, Adil Ismail (twin brother), Pele Koljonen (son),
 Jussi Jääskeläinen, Will Jääskeläinen (son)
 Richard Olav Jensen, Fredrik Jensen (brother)
 Shefki Kuqi, Njazi Kuqi (brother), Albert Kuqi (brother)
 Olavi Litmanen, Jari Litmanen (son)
 Niklas Moisander, Henrik Moisander (twin brother)
 Patrick O'Shaughnessy, Daniel O'Shaughnessy (brother)
 Riku Riski, Roope Riski (brother)
 Pasi Tauriainen, Julius Tauriainen (son), Jimi Tauriainen (son), Kimmo Tauriainen (brother), Vesa Tauriainen (brother)
 Sauli Väisänen, Leo Väisänen (brother)
 Simo Valakari, Paavo Valakari, Onni Valakari (sons)

France 

 Vincent Acapandié,  William Gros, Mathieu Acapandié (cousins)
 Seth Adonkor, Marcel Desailly (half-brother)
 Joris Ahlinvi,  Mattéo Ahlinvi (brother)
 Morgan Amalfitano, Romain Amalfitano (brother)
  Jocelyn Angloma,  Johan Angloma (son)
 Plaisir Bahamboula,  Dylan Bahamboula, Jason Bahamboula (brothers)  Yven Moyo (cousin)
 Richard Barroilhet, Jordan Barroilhet (brother),  Clemente Montes (cousin)
 Mathieu Bodmer, Mathéo Bodmer (son)
 Basile Boli (see  Roger Boli)
 Maxime Bossis, Joël Bossis (brother)
 Jean-Alain Boumsong, Yannick Boumsong (brother), David N'Gog (cousin)
 Rachid Bourabia,  Mehdi Bourabia (brother)
 Eric Cantona, Joel Cantona (brother), Sacha Opinel (nephew)
 Cédric Carrasso, Johann Carrasso (brother)
 Delphine Cascarino, Estelle Cascarino (twin sister)
 Bruno Cheyrou, Benoît Cheyrou (brother)
 Aly Cissokho (see  Issa Cissokho)
 Daphne Corboz,  Mael Corboz (brother),  Rachel Corboz (sister)
 Carlos Curbelo, Gaston Curbelo (son)
 Stéphane Dalmat,  Wilfried Dalmat (brother)
 Patrick Delamontagne, Laurent Delamontagne (brother)
 Henri Delaunay, Pierre Delaunay (son)
 Jean Djorkaeff, Youri Djorkaeff, Micha Djorkaeff (sons), Oan Djorkaeff (grandson/son of Youri)
 Nabil Fekir, Yassin Fekir (brother)
 Gueïda Fofana,  Guessouma Fofana, Mamadou Fofana (brother)
 André Frey, Raymond Frey (son), Sébastien Frey, Nicolas Frey (grandsons) 
 Bernard Genghini, Benjamin Genghini (son)
 Alain Giresse, Thibault Giresse (son)
 Bafétimbi Gomis,  Nampalys Mendy,  Alexandre Mendy (cousins)
 Maxime Gonalons, Lucas Camelo (cousin)
 Christian Gourcuff, Yoann Gourcuff (son)
 Antoine Griezmann (see  Amaro Lopes)
 Josuha Guilavogui,  Morgan Guilavogui (brother)
 Jean-François Hernandez, Lucas Hernandez, Theo Hernandez (sons)
 Daniel Horlaville, Christophe Horlaville (son)
 Aldo Kalulu,  Gédéon Kalulu, Pierre Kalulu (brothers)
 Olivier Kapo, Maxen Kapo (nephew)
 Fritz Keller, Curt Keller (brother)
 Désiré Koranyi (see  Lajos Korányi)
 Alexandre Lacazette, Romuald Lacazette (cousin)
 Jean Laurent, Lucien Laurent (brother)
 Anthony Le Tallec, Damien Le Tallec (brother), Florent Sinama Pongolle (cousin)
 Hugo Lloris, Gautier Lloris (brother)
 François Ludo, Éric Sikora (nephew)
  Florent Malouda,  Lesly Malouda (brother),  Kévin Rimane (cousin)
 Steve Mandanda,  Parfait Mandanda,  Riffi Mandanda (brothers)
 Johan Martial, Anthony Martial (brother), Alexis Martial (cousin)
 Joris Marveaux, Sylvain Marveaux (brother)
 Rio Mavuba (see  Ricky Mavuba)
 Kylian Mbappé (see  Kembo Uba Kembo)
 Griedge Mbock Bathy, Hiang'a Mbock (brother)
 Ferland Mendy (see  Édouard Mendy)
 Yohan M'Vila, Yann M'Vila (brother)
 Samir Nasri, Kaïs Nasri (cousin)
 Louisa Nécib,  Liassine Cadamuro (husband)
 Abdelhakim Omrani,  Billel Omrani (brother)
 Gérald Passi, Franck Passi (brother),  Bryan Passi (nephew/son of Franck)
 Paul Pogba (see  Florentin Pogba)
 Ángel Rambert,  Sebastián Rambert (son)
 Hervé Revelli, Patrick Revelli (brother)
 Franck Ribéry, François Ribéry, Steeven Ribéry (brothers)
 Robert Rico, Jocelyn Rico (brother)
 Roger Rio, Patrice Rio (son)
 Omar Sahnoun, Nicolas Sahnoun (son)
 Guy Sénac, Didier Sénac (son)
 Noël Sinibaldi, Paul Sinibaldi, Pierre Sinibaldi (brothers)
 Moussa Sylla (see  Yacouba Sylla)
 Lilian Thuram, Marcus Thuram, Khéphren Thuram (sons),  Yohann Thuram-Ulien (cousin)
 José Touré (see  Bako Touré)
 Baba Traoré,  Cheick Traoré (brother)
 David Trezeguet (see  Jorge Trezeguet)
 Pascal Vahirua (see  Erroll Bennett)
 Tony Vairelles, Diego Vairelles, Giovan Vairelles (brothers), David Vairelles, Ludovic Vairelles (cousins)
 Raphaël Varane, Jonathan Varane (half-brother)
 Zinedine Zidane, Enzo Zidane, Luca Zidane. Théo Zidane, Elyaz Zidane (sons)
 Kurt Zouma (see  Lionel Zouma)
 Georges Zvunka, Jules Zvunka, Victor Zvunka (brothers)

Georgia 
Revaz Arveladze, Archil Arveladze (brother), Shota Arveladze (twin brother of Archil), Vato Arveladze (son of Revaz)
Kakhaber Kacharava, Nika Kacharava (son)

Germany 

 Rüdiger Abramczik, Volker Abramczik (brother)
 Karl Allgöwer,  (brother)
 Klaus Allofs, Thomas Allofs (brother)
 Fatmire Alushi (see  Enis Alushi)
 , Marvin Bakalorz (son)
 Ridle Baku, Makana Baku (twin brother)
 Bertram Beierlorzer, Achim Beierlorzer (brother)
 Francis Banecki, Nicole Banecki (sister)
 Franz Beckenbauer, Stephan Beckenbauer (son), Luca Beckenbauer, Elias Beckenbauer (grandsons/Stephan's sons)
 Lars Bender, Sven Bender (twin brother)
 , Daniel Bierofka (son)
 Philipp Bönig, Sebastian Bönig, Vincent Bönig (brothers)
 Herbert Burdenski, Dieter Burdenski (son), Fabian Burdenski (grandson/Dieter's son)
 Cacau,  Vlademir (brother)
 Charly Dörfel, Bernd Dörfel (brother)
 Edwin Dutton (see  James Quar McPherson)
 Stephan Engels, Mario Engels (son)
 Franco Foda, Sandro Foda (son)
 Bernd Förster, Karlheinz Förster (brother)
 , Michael Frontzeck (son)
 Friedhelm Funkel, Wolfgang Funkel (brother)
 Maurizio Gaudino, Gianluca Gaudino (son)
 Yannick Gerhardt, Anna Gerhardt (sister)
 Fabian Götze, Mario Götze, Felix Götze (brothers)
 Stephan Groß, Pascal Groß (son)
 , Kevin Großkreutz (cousin)
 Helmut Haller,  (son), Christian Hochstätter (nephew)
 Matthias Hamann, Dietmar Hamann (brother)
 , Patrick Helmes (son)
 Bernd Hobsch, Patrick Hobsch (son)
 Uli Hoeneß, Dieter Hoeneß (brother), Sebastian Hoeneß (nephew/Dieter's son)
 Lewis Holtby, Joshua Holtby (brother)
 Hermann Hummels, Mats Hummels, Jonas Hummels (sons)
 Franz Islacker, Frank Islacker (son), Mandy Islacker (granddaughter/Frank's daughter)
 Ditmar Jakobs, Michael Jakobs (brother)
 Thomas Kempe, Dennis Kempe, Tobias Kempe (sons)
 Isabel Kerschowski, Monique Kerschowski (twin sister)
 Sami Khedira, Rani Khedira (brother)
 Ulf Kirsten, Benjamin Kirsten (son)
 Jürgen Klinsmann,  Jonathan Klinsmann (son)
 Hans Klodt, Bernhard Klodt (stepbrother)
 Miroslav Klose (see  Josef Klose)
 Lukas Klostermann,  (sister)
 Harry Koch, Robin Koch (son)
 Andreas Köpke, Pascal Köpke (son)
 Erwin Kremers, Helmut Kremers (twin brother)
 Oliver Kreuzer, Niklas Kreuzer (son)
 Roland Kroos, Toni Kroos, Felix Kroos (sons)
 , Stefan Kuntz (son)
 Dieter Kurrat, Hans-Jürgen Kurrat (brother)
 Matthias Langkamp, Sebastian Langkamp (brother)
 Dzsenifer Marozsán (see  János Marozsán)
 Martin Max, Philipp Max (son)
 Christoph Metzelder, Malte Metzelder (brother)
 Dominique Ndjeng,  Marcel Ndjeng (brother)
 , Christian Nerlinger (son)
 Josef Posipal, Peer Posipal (son), Patrick Posipal (grandson/Peer's son)
 Helmut Rahn,  Kevin-Prince Boateng (grandnephews), Jérôme Boateng (half-brother of George & Kevin-Prince)
 Oliver Reck, Daniel Reck, Gian-Luca Reck (sons), Pierre-Michel Lasogga (stepson)
 Max Reichenberger, Thomas Reichenberger (son)
 Alois Reinhardt, Dominik Reinhardt (son)
 Knut Reinhardt, Lasse Lehmann (son), Jens Lehmann (Lasse's stepfather)
 Karl-Heinz Riedle, Alessandro Riedle (son)
 Oskar Rohr, Gernot Rohr (grandnephew)
 Florian Rudy, Sebastian Rudy (brother)
 , Karl-Heinz Rummenigge, Michael Rummenigge (brothers), Marco Rummenigge (nephew/Michael's son)
 Leroy Sané (see  Souleyman Sané)
 Célia Šašić (see  Milan Šašić)
 , Marcel Schäfer (son)
 Fred Schaub,  Louis Schaub (son)
 Niels Schlotterbeck, Keven Schlotterbeck, Nico Schlotterbeck (nephews)
 Andreas Schmidt, Oliver Schmidt (twin brother)
 Mehmet Scholl, Lucas Scholl (son)
 Helmut Schön, Erwin Schön (brother)
 Christian Schreier, Toni Schreier (brother)
 , Jan Schröers (son),  Jannik Vestergaard (grandson/Jan's nephew)
 , Francisco Copado (son-in-law), Lucas Copado (Francisco's son),  Hasan Salihamidžić (Francisco's brother-in-law)
 , Timo Werner (son)
 Nico Schulz, Gian Luca Schulz (brother)
 Manfred Schwabl, Markus Schwabl (son)
 Alfred Schweinsteiger, Tobias Schweinsteiger, Bastian Schweinsteiger (sons)
 Sahr Senesie, Antonio Rüdiger (half brother)
 Lukas Sinkiewicz, Michael Gardawski (cousin)
 Elia Soriano,  Roberto Soriano (brother)
 Rahman Soyudoğru,  Ömer Toprak (cousin)
 Sandra Starke (see  Manfred Starke)
 Bernhard Steffen, Horst Steffen (son)
 Hans Sturm, Ralf Sturm (son)
 Michael Tarnat, Niklas Tarnat (son)
 , Klaus Toppmöller (brother),  (son), Dino Toppmöller (nephew/Klaus' son)
 Rudi Völler, Kévin Völler-Adducci (son)
 Fritz Walter, Ottmar Walter (brothers)
 , Florian Wirtz (brother)
 Wolfgang Wolf,  (brother), Patrick Wolf (son)
 Pia Wunderlich, Tina Wunderlich (sister)
 ,  Sefa Yılmaz (brother)
 Dieter Zorc, Michael Zorc (son)

East Germany 

 Roland Ducke, Peter Ducke (brother)
 Lothar Kurbjuweit,  Tobias Kurbjuweit (son)
 Uwe Rösler,  Colin Rösler (son)
 Klaus Sammer,  Matthias Sammer (son)
 ,  Dirk Schuster (son)
 Wolfgang Seguin,  Paul Seguin (son), Norman Seguin (brother), Nick Seguin (son of Norman, nephew of Paul & grandson of Wolfgang)
 Hilmar Weilandt,  Tom Weilandt (son)

Gibraltar 
 Allen Bula, Danny Higginbotham (nephew)
 Lee Casciaro, Ryan Casciaro (brother), Kyle Casciaro (brother)
 Joseph Chipolina, Kenneth Chipolina (brother)
 Anthony Hernandez, Andrew Hernandez (brother)
 Terrence Jolley, Ethan Jolley (son), Tjay De Barr (nephew & cousin of Ethan Jolley)

Greece 

 Giorgos Donis, Christos Donis, Anastasios Donis (sons)
 Giannis Douvikas, Anastasios Douvikas (son)
 Anthimos Kapsis, Michalis Kapsis (son)
 Stelios Manolas, Kostas Manolas (nephew)
 Ioannis Samaras, Georgios Samaras (son)
 Panagiotis Vlachodimos, Odisseas Vlachodimos (brother)

Hungary 

 Flórián Albert, Flórián Albert Jr. (son)
 József Bozsik, Péter Bozsik (son)
 Pál Dárdai, Sr., Balázs Dárdai (son), Pál Dárdai, Jr. (son), Palkó Dárdai (grandson, son of Dárdai, Jr.),  Márton Dárdai (grandson, son of Dárdai, Jr.)
 Péter Disztl, László Disztl (brother), Dávid Disztl (nephew)
 Lajos Korányi, Mátyás Korányi (brother),  Désiré Koranyi (brother)
 Krisztián Lisztes, Krisztián Lisztes Jr (son)
 János Marozsán,  Dzsenifer Marozsán (daughter)
 Ferenc Puskás Sr., Ferenc Puskás (son)
 István Sallói, Dániel Sallói (son)
 Ádám Simon, András Simon (twin brother)
 Zoltán Stieber, András Stieber
 Ottó Vincze, Gábor Vincze (brother)

Iceland 

 Axel Óskar Andrésson, Jökull Andrésson (brother)
 Arnór Guðjohnsen, Eiður Guðjohnsen (son), Sveinn Aron Guðjohnsen (grandson, son of Eiður), Andri Guðjohnsen (grandson, son of Eiður)
 Albert Guðmundsson, Ingi Björn Albertsson (son), Guðmundur Benediktsson (Ingadóttir's husband), Albert Guðmundsson (great-grandson, son of Ingadóttir and Benediktsson)
 Arnar Gunnlaugsson, Bjarki Gunnlaugsson (twin brother)
 Viðar Halldórsson, Arnar Viðarsson (son), Davíð Viðarsson (son), Bjarni Viðarsson (son)
 Haraldur Ingólfsson, Jónína Víglundsdóttir (wife), Tryggvi Hrafn Haraldsson (son), Hákon Arnar Haraldsson (son)
 Rúnar Kristinsson, Rúnar Alex Rúnarsson (son)
 Gylfi Sigurðsson, Karólína Lea Vilhjálmsdóttir (niece)
 Andri Sigþórsson, Kolbeinn Sigþórsson (brother), Amanda Andradóttir (Andri's daughter)
 Ragna Lóa Stefánsdóttir, Hermann Hreiðarsson (husband), Ída Marín Hermannsdóttir (daughter)
 Eyjólfur Sverrisson, Hólmar Örn Eyjólfsson (son)
 Guðjón Þórðarson, Þórður Guðjónsson (son), Bjarni Guðjónsson (son), Joey Guðjónsson (son), Björn Sigurðarson (half brother of Þórður, Bjarni and Joey), Ísak Bergmann Jóhannesson (grandon of Þórðarson, son of Joey Guðjónsson)
 Willum Þór Þórsson, Willum Þór Willumsson (son)
 Margrét Lára Viðarsdóttir, Elísa Viðarsdóttir (sister)

Italy 

 Beniamino Abate, Ignazio Abate (son)
 Ermanno Aebi, Giorgio Aebi (son)
 Emilio Badini (see  Angelo Badini)
 Roberto Baggio, Eddy Baggio (brother)
 Mario Balotelli,  Enock Barwuah (brother),  Obafemi Martins (brother-in-law)
 Giuseppe Baresi, Franco Baresi (brother), Regina Baresi (daughter)
 Alessandro Birindelli, Samuele Birindelli (son)
 Ernesto Borel,  Aldo Borel, Felice Borel (sons)
 Marco Borriello, Fabio Borriello (brother)
 Matteo Brighi (see  Alessandro Brighi)
 Lorenzo Buffon, Gianluigi Buffon (grandnephew)
 Fabio Cannavaro, Paolo Cannavaro (brothers)
 Guido Carboni, Amedeo Carboni (brother)
 Enrico Chiesa, Federico Chiesa (son)
 Bruno Conti, Andrea Conti, Daniele Conti (sons)
 Luigi De Agostini, Michele De Agostini (son)
 Attilio Demaría,  Félix Demaría (brother) 
 Flavio Destro, Mattia Destro (son)
 Eusebio Di Francesco, Federico Di Francesco (son)
 Angelo Di Livio, Lorenzo Di Livio (son)
 Alfredo Di Stefano Sr.,  Alfredo Di Stéfano (son)
 Antonio Donnarumma, Gianluigi Donnarumma (brother)
 Otávio Fantoni (see  Ninão)
 Giacomo Ferri, Riccardo Ferri (brother)
 Melania Gabbiadini, Manolo Gabbiadini (brother)
 Giovanni Galli, Niccolò Galli (son)
 Gennaro Gattuso,  Cataldo Cozza (cousin)
 Otmar Gazzari, Lorenzo Gazzari (brother)
 Sebastian Giovinco, Giuseppe Giovinco (brother)
 Anfilogino Guarisi (see  Manuel Augusto Marques)
 Antonio Insigne, Lorenzo Insigne, Roberto Insigne, Marco Insigne (brothers)
 Filippo Inzaghi, Simone Inzaghi (brother)
 Giovanni Kean, Moise Kean (brother)
 Tommaso Maestrelli, Giuseppe Materazzi (father-in-law of Tommaso's son), Marco Materazzi, Matteo Materazzi (Giuseppe's sons), Alessio Maestrelli (Tommaso & Giuseppe's grandson)  
 Cesare Maldini, Paolo Maldini (son), Christian Maldini, Daniel Maldini (grandsons, sons of Paolo)
 Antonio Manicone,  Carlo Manicone (son) Lorenzo Malagrida (nephew)
 Luca Marchegiani, Gabriele Marchegiani (son)
 Valentino Mazzola, Sandro Mazzola, Ferruccio Mazzola (sons)
 Eugenio Mosso (see  Francisco Mosso)
 Alessandro Nesta, Gian Marco Nesta (nephew)
 Gianluca Pagliuca, Mattia Pagliuca (son)
 Emerson Palmieri (see  Giovanni)
 Alessandro Pierini, Nicholas Pierini (son)
 Giampiero Pinzi, Riccardo Pinzi (son)
 Eduardo Ricagni,  Eduardos Kontogeorgakis (son)
 Pierluigi Ronzon, Gianmarco Zigoni (grandnephew), Gianfranco Zigoni (Gianmarco's father)
 Giuseppe Rosetti, Gino Rossetti (brother)
 Juan Alberto Schiaffino (see  Raúl Schiaffino)
 Michele Serena, Riccardo Serena (son)
 Andrea Silenzi, Christian Silenzi (son)
 Roberto Soriano (see  Elia Soriano)
 Roberto Vieri, Christian Vieri,  Max Vieri (sons)
 Antonio Vojak, Oliviero Vojak (brother)
 Walter Zenga, Jacopo Zenga (son)
 Cristian Zenoni, Damiano Zenoni (twin brother)
 Gianfranco Zola, Andrea Zola (son)

Kosovo

Latvia 

 Ilmārs Verpakovskis, Māris Verpakovskis (son)

Liechtenstein 

 Thomas Beck, Roger Beck (brother)
 Mario Frick, Yanik Frick (son)
 Rainer Hasler, Nicolas Hasler (son)
 Martin Stocklasa, Michael Stocklasa (brother)

Lithuania 
 Deividas Česnauskis, Edgaras Česnauskis (brother)
 Robertas Fridrikas, Mantas Fridrikas,  Lukas Fridrikas (sons)
 Aurimas Kučys, Armandas Kučys (son)

Luxembourg 

 Frank Deville, Maurice Deville (son)
 Théo Malget, Kevin Malget (son)
 Serge Thill, Sébastien Thill (son), Olivier Thill (son), Vincent Thill (son)

Malta 

 Ferdinando Apap, Daniel Bogdanović (brother-in-law)
 Joseph Mbong, Paul Mbong (brother)
 Chucks Nwoko, Udo Nwoko (brother), Kyrian Nwoko (son of Chucks)
 Salvinu Schembri, Eric Schembri (son), André Schembri (grandson)

Moldova 

 Oleg Andronic, Gheorghe Andronic, Valeriu Andronic (cousin), Igor Andronic (cousin), Maxim Andronic (brother of Valeriu and Igor)
 Alexandru Antoniuc, Maxim Antoniuc (brother)
 Pavel Cebanu, Ilie Cebanu (son)
 Serghei Cleșcenco, Nicky Cleșcenco (son)
 Serghei Covalciuc,  Kyrylo Kovalchuk (brother)
 Ilie Damașcan, Vitalie Damașcan (brother)
 Sergiu Epureanu, Alexandru Epureanu (brother)
 Nicolae Mandrîcenco, Ivan Mandricenco (brother), Constantin Mandrîcenco, Dmitri Mandrîcenco (sons)
 Sergiu Plătică, Mihai Plătică (brother)

Montenegro

Netherlands 

 Wim Anderiesen, Wim Anderiesen Jr. (son)
 Hennie Ardesch, Sander Westerveld (son-in-law),  Sem Westerveld (grandson/Sander's son)
 Frank Berghuis, Steven Berghuis (son)
 Dennis Bergkamp, Roland Bergkamp (nephew), Donny van de Beek (son-in-law)
 Wim Bleijenberg, Hans Bleijenberg (son)
 Danny Blind, Daley Blind (son)
 Frank de Boer, Ronald de Boer (twin brother), Calvin Stengs (son-in-law)
 Winston Bogarde, Danilho Doekhi. Melayro Bogarde, Lamare Bogarde (nephews)
 Peter Bosz, Sonny Bosz (son)
 Marciano Bruma, Jeffrey Bruma (brother), Kyle Ebecilio (cousin)
 Evert Bulder, Jaap Bulder (brother)
 Johan Cruyff, Jordi Cruyff (son),  Jesús Angoy (son-in-law),  Jesjua Angoy-Cruyff (grandson)
 Edgar Davids, Lorenzo Davids (cousin)
 Royston Drenthe,  Giovanni Drenthe (brother)
 Laros Duarte,  Deroy Duarte (brother)
 Urby Emanuelson, Jean-Paul Boëtius (see  Errol Emanuelson)
 Jan Everse Sr, Jan Everse Jr (son), Coen Moulijn (cousin)
 Leroy Fer, Patrick van Aanholt (cousins)
 Alfons Fosu-Mensah, Timothy Fosu-Mensah, Paul Fosu-Mensah (brothers)
 Mannes Francken, Jacques Francken (brother)
 Janus van der Gijp, Wim van der Gijp, Cor van der Gijp (brothers), René van der Gijp (nephew/Wim's son)
 Danzell Gravenberch, Ryan Gravenberch (brother)
 Cees Groot, Henk Groot (brother)
 Ruud Gullit, Maxim Gullit (son)
 Jonathan de Guzmán (see  Julian de Guzman)
 Cor van der Hart, Mickey van der Hart (grandson)
 Jimmy Floyd Hasselbaink (see  Jacques Alex Hasselbaink)
 Dido Havenaar,  Mike Havenaar,  Nikki Havenaar (sons)
 Guus Hiddink, René Hiddink (brother)
 Pierre van Hooijdonk, Sydney van Hooijdonk (son)
 Klaas-Jan Huntelaar, Koen Huntelaar (nephew)
 Kew Jaliens (see  Kenneth Jaliens)
 Collins John, Paddy John, Ola John (brothers)
 Jerry de Jong, Nigel de Jong (son)
 Siem de Jong, Luuk de Jong (brother)
 Piet Keizer, Marcel Keizer (cousin)
 René van de Kerkhof, Willy van de Kerkhof (twin brother)
 Dolf Kessler, Boelie Kessler (brother), Tonny Kessler, Dé Kessler (cousins)
 Patrick Kluivert, Justin Kluivert (see  Kenneth Kluivert)
 Martin Koeman, Ronald Koeman, Erwin Koeman (sons)
 Terence Kongolo, Rodney Kongolo, Fidel Kongolo (brothers)
 Teun Koopmeiners, Peer Koopmeiners (brother)
 Hans Kraay Sr., Hans Kraay Jr. (son)
 Kees Krijgh Sr., Kees Krijgh Jr. (nephew)
 André Krul, Tim Krul (brother)
 Noa Lang (see  Nourdin Boukhari)
 Bert van Lingen, Vera Pauw (wife)
 Bert van Marwijk, Mark van Bommel (son-in-law), Thomas van Bommel (grandson/Mark's son)
 Rob Matthaei,  Marc Klok (nephew)
 Mary van der Meer, Claudia van den Heiligenberg (daughter),  Lucie Voňková (daughter-in-law/Claudia's wife)
 Harry Melis, Manon Melis (daughter)
 John Metgod, Edward Metgod (brother)
 Vivianne Miedema, Lars Miedema (brother)
 Keje Molenaar, Matthijs de Ligt (son-in-law)
 Ibad Muhamadu,  Roland Alberg (brother), Lorenzo Ebecilio (nephew)
 Gerrie Mühren, Arnold Mühren (brother), Robert Mühren (nephew)
 Jan Mulder, Youri Mulder (son)
 Kiki Musampa, Nordin Musampa (nephew)
 Johan Neeskens, Ricky van Wolfswinkel (son-in-law)
 Joop Odenthal, Cas Odenthal (grandson)
 Bas Paauwe Sr., Jaap Paauwe (brother), Bas Paauwe Jr. (son)
 Patrick Paauwe, Cees Paauwe (brother)
 Jan Pelser, Adriaan Pelser, Joop Pelser, Fons Pelser (brothers)
 Jan Poortvliet, Jan Paul van Hecke (nephew)
 Jaap van Praag, Michael van Praag (son)
 Karim Rekik,  Omar Rekik (brother)
 Frank Rijkaard (see  Herman Rijkaard)
 René Roord, Jill Roord (daughter)
 Clarence Seedorf (see  Johann Seedorf)
 Harry Sinkgraven, Daley Sinkgraven (son)
 Jeffrey Sneijder, Wesley Sneijder, Rodney Sneijder (brothers)
 Simon Tahamata, Calvin Tahamata (brother), Michaël Tahamata, Petrus Tahamata (nephews)
 Jurriën Timber, Quinten Timber (twin brother),  Dylan Timber (brother)
 Janny Timisela, Josephine Timisela (sister)
 Gerald Vanenburg (see  Roy Vanenburg)
 Frank Verlaat, Jesper Verlaat (son)
 Tonny Vilhena (see  Toy Vilhena)
 Georginio Wijnaldum, Rajiv van La Parra (half-brother), Giliano Wijnaldum (brother)
 Aron Winter (see  Ricardo Winter)
 Rob Witschge, Richard Witschge (brother), Dave Bulthuis (Richard's son-in-law)

North Macedonia

Northern Ireland 

 Danny Blanchflower, Jackie Blanchflower (brother)
 Fay Coyle, Liam Coyle (son)
 Jonny Evans, Corry Evans (brother)
 Grant McCann, Ryan McCann (brother)
 Conor McLaughlin, Ryan McLaughlin (brother)
 Stephen Robinson, Harry Robinson (son)
 Kenny Shiels, Dean Shiels (son),
 Nigel Worthington, Brendan Rodgers (cousin),  Anton Rodgers (son of Brendan)

Norway 

 Mohammed Abdellaoue, Mustafa Abdellaoue (brother), Omar Elabdellaoui (cousin), Jones El-Abdellaoui (cousin & brother of Omar)
 Yaw Ihle Amankwah,  Emmanuel Frimpong (cousin)
 Jørn Andersen,  Niklas Andersen (son)
 Harald Berg, Knut Berg (brother), Ørjan Berg, Runar Berg, Arild Berg (sons), Patrick Berg (grandson/son of Ørjan)
 Kristin Blystad-Bjerke, Trine Rønning (wife)
 Lars Bohinen, Emil Bohinen (son)
 Nils Arne Eggen, Knut Torbjørn Eggen (son)
 Tarik Elyounoussi, Mohamed Elyounoussi (cousin)
 Kjell Rune Flo, Jostein Flo, Jarle Flo, Tore André Flo (brothers), Ulrik Flo (son), Håvard Flo (cousin), Per-Egil Flo (nephew of Håvard)
 Terje Gulbrandsen, Solveig Gulbrandsen (daughter)
 , Henrik Gulden (son)
 Alfie Haaland, Erling Haaland (son), Albert Tjåland (nephew), Jonatan Braut Brunes, Emma Braut Brunes (cousins of Erling)
 Hugo Hansen, Cato Hansen (son), Hege Hansen, Tuva Hansen (daughters)
 Kai Erik Herlovsen, Isabell Herlovsen (daughter)
 Even Hovland, Stine Hovland (sister)
 Odd Iversen, Steffen Iversen (son)
 Jørn Jamtfall, Michael Jamtfall (son)
 Roald Jensen, Sondre Jensen (son), Roy Wassberg,  (son-in-law), Niklas Jensen Wassberg (grandon, son of Roald)
 Truls Jenssen, Ruben Yttergård Jenssen, Ulrik Yttergård Jenssen (sons)
 Tor Gunnar Johnsen, Dennis Johnsen, Mikael Tørset Johnsen (sons)
 Anne Kitolano, Eric Kitolano, John Kitolano, Joshua Kitolano (brothers), Nema Kitolano (sister)
 Jon Knudsen, Mari Knudsen (sister)
 Roger Nilsen, Steinar Nilsen (brother)
 Hans Erik Ødegaard, Martin Ødegaard (son)
 Erik Ruthford Pedersen, Kjetil Ruthford Pedersen, Steinar Pedersen (sons), Emil Pedersen (grandson/Steinar's son)
 Thomas Pereira, Adrian Pereira (son)
 Tore Reginiussen, Mads Reginiussen, Christian Reginiussen (brothers)
 John Arne Riise, Bjørn Helge Riise (brother)
 Terje Rise, Vilde Bøe Risa (daughter)
 Einar Rossbach, Sondre Rossbach (son)
 Gøran Sørloth, Alexander Sørloth (son)
 Lene Storløkken, Hege Storløkken (sister)
 Erik Thorstvedt, Kristian Thorstvedt (son)
 Thomas Wæhler, Kristine Edner (wife)

Poland 
 Filip Bednarek, Jan Bednarek (brother)
 Józef Boniek, Zbigniew Boniek (son)
 Paweł Brożek, Piotr Brożek (twin brother)
 Łukasz Broź, Mateusz Broź (brother)
 Jerzy Brzęczek, Jakub Błaszczykowski (nephew)
 Adam Buksa, Aleksander Buksa (brother)
 Jacek Burkhardt, Marcin Burkhardt (son), Filip Burkhardt (son)
 Matty Cash (see  Stuart Cash)
 Dariusz Drągowski, Bartłomiej Drągowski (son)
 Jerzy Dudek, Dariusz Dudek (brother)
 Andrzej Iwan, Bartosz Iwan (son)
 Roman Jańczyk, Wiesław Jańczyk (son)
 Janusz Gancarczyk, Marek Gancarczyk, Mateusz Gancarczyk, Andrzej Gancarczyk, Waldemar Gancarczyk, Krzysztof Gancarczyk (brothers)
 Radosław Gilewicz, Konrad Gilewicz (son)
 Jan Jałocha, Marcin Jałocha (nephew)
 Josef Klose,  Miroslav Klose (son)
 Andrzej Kobylański, Martin Kobylański (son)
 Roman Kosecki, Jakub Kosecki (son)
 Kazimierz Kmiecik, Grzegorz Kmiecik (son)
 Roman Korynt, Tomasz Korynt (son)
 Jan Kotlarczyk, Józef Kotlarczyk (brother), Tadeusz Kotlarczyk (son)
 Jan Loth, Stefan Loth (brother)
 Krystian Michallik,  Janusz Michallik (son)
 Piotr Mowlik, Mariusz Mowlik (son), David Topolski (nephew)
 Adam Musiał, Tomasz Musiał (son)
 Ryszard Robakiewicz, Józef Robakiewicz (brother), Zbigniew Robakiewicz (brother), Paweł Golański (nephew)
 Adrian Sikora, Mieczysław Sikora (brother)
 Maciej Szczęsny, Wojciech Szczęsny (son)
 Włodzimierz Smolarek, Euzebiusz Smolarek (son)
 Mieczysław Szewczyk, Michał Szewczyk (son), Kamil Szewczyk (son)
 Marek Świerczewski, Piotr Świerczewski (brother)
 Stanisław Terlecki, Maciej Terlecki (son)
 Tomasz Wałdoch, Kamil Wałdoch (son)
 Robert Warzycha, Konrad Warzycha (son)
 Jerzy Wilim, Jan Wilim (brother)
 Piotr Włodarczyk, Szymon Włodarczyk (son)
 Ryszard Wyrobek, Jerzy Wyrobek (son)
 Tadeusz Zastawniak, Franciszek Zastawniak, Stanisław Zastawniak (brothers)
 Paweł Zieliński, Piotr Zieliński (brother)
 Marcin Żewłakow, Michał Żewłakow (twin brother)
 Michał Żyro, Mateusz Żyro (brother)

Portugal 
 José Águas, Rui Águas (son), Raul Águas (nephew)
 Carlos Alhinho,  Alexandre Alhinho (brother)
 Bruno Alves (see  Geraldo Assoviador)
 Carlos Alves, João Alves (grandson)
 António André, André André (son)
 Fábio Coentrão, Rui Coentrão (cousin)
 Sérgio Conceição, Sérgio Conceição Jr., Rodrigo Conceição, Francisco Conceição (sons)
 Deco (see  Lela)
 Yannick Djaló,  José Embaló (cousin)
 Domingos, Gonçalo Paciência, Vasco Paciência (sons)
 Manuel Fernandes,  Gélson Fernandes,  Cabral,  Edimilson Fernandes (cousins)
 Matilde Fidalgo, Bernardo Silva (cousin)
 Artur Fonte, José Fonte, Rui Fonte (sons)
 Nuno Gomes, Tiago Ribeiro (brother)
 Ricardo Horta, André Horta (brother)
 Edgar Ié,  Edelino Ié (twin brother)
 João Mário (see  Wilson Eduardo)
 Laurindo,  Mauro (son)
 Amaro Lopes,  Antoine Griezmann (grandson)
 Miguel Lopes, Nuno Lopes (twin brother)
 Ariza Makukula (see  Kuyangana Makukula)
 Maniche, Jorge Ribeiro (brother)
 Manuel Augusto Marques,  Anfilogino Guarisi (son)
 Gelson Martins, Euclides Cabral (cousin)
 Abel Miglietti (see  Zeca Miglietti)
 António Morato, António Morato, Jr. (son)
 Félix Mourinho, José Mourinho (son)
 Pedro Neto (see  Sérgio Lomba)
 Fernando Peyroteo, Diogo Peyroteo (great-grandson), José Couceiro (grandnephew)
 João Pinto, Sérgio Pinto (brother), Tiago Pinto (son)
 Hélder Postiga, José Postiga (brother)
 Artur Quaresma, Alfredo Quaresma (cousin), Ricardo Quaresma (great-nephew of Artur and Alfredo)
 Samuel Quina, Domingos Quina (son)
 Renato Sanches (see  Cláudio Tavares)
 Jorge Silva, Chico Silva (brother)
 Jorge Silva, Fábio Silva (son)
 António Sousa, Ricardo Sousa (son), Afonso Sousa, (grandson, son of Ricardo), José Sousa (nephew),  Bruno Leite (son of José)
 José Taira, Afonso Taira (son)
 Silvestre Varela, Nilton Varela (nephew)
 António Veloso, Miguel Veloso (son)
 Pedro Venâncio, Frederico Venâncio (son)
 José Luís Vidigal (see  Beto Vidigal)

Republic of Ireland 

 Kwame Ampadu,  Ethan Ampadu (son)
 Frank Brady Sr., Pat Brady, Ray Brady, Frank Brady Jr., Liam Brady (great-nephews), Liam Brady Jr. (son of Liam)
 Robbie Brady, Gareth Brady (brother), Liam Brady (brother)
 Jason Byrne, Robbie Keane (cousin)
 Christy Giles, Johnny Giles (son),  Nobby Stiles (Johnny's brother-in-law)
 Paddy Henderson, Dave Henderson (son), Stephen Henderson (son), Wayne Henderson (son), Stephen Henderson (grandson/Stephen's son)
 Stephen Hunt, Noel Hunt (brother)
 Alan Kelly Sr., Gary Kelly (son), Alan Kelly Jr. (son)
 Gary Kelly, Ian Harte (nephew)
 Con Martin, Mick Martin (son), Gerry Garvan (son-in-law), Owen Garvan (grandson/son of Gerry)
 Gary McCabe, Katie McCabe (sister)
 David O'Leary, Pierce O'Leary (brother)
 Alan Quinn, Stephen Quinn (brother), Keith Quinn (brother)
 John Russell, Julie-Ann Russell (sister)
 Paddy Turner, John Delamere (step-brother),  Callum Elder (grandson)
 Ronnie Whelan, Sr., Ronnie Whelan, Jr. (son), Paul Whelan (son)

Romania 

 George Bănuță, Alexandru Bănuță (son), Anne-Marie Bănuță (daughter)
 Daniel Boloca, Gabriele Boloca (brother)
 Mihai Drăguș, Denis Drăguș (son)
 Mircea Dridea, Virgil Dridea (brother)
 Gheorghe Hagi, Ianis Hagi (son)
 Adrian Ilie, Sabin Ilie (brother)
 Mircea Lucescu, Răzvan Lucescu (son)
 Nicolae Lupescu, Ioan Lupescu (son)
 Silviu Lung, Tiberiu Lung (son), Silviu Lung Jr. (son)
 Ion Nunweiller, Lică Nunweiller (brother), Radu Nunweiller (brother)
 Dorin Goian, Lucian Goian (brother)

Russia 

 Dmitri Alenichev, Andrei Alenichev (brother)
 Aleksei Berezutski, Vasili Berezutski (twin brother)
 Vladimir Beschastnykh, Mikhail Beschastnykh (twin brother)
 Rinat Bilyaletdinov, Diniyar Bilyaletdinov (son)
 Vladimir But, Vitali But (brother)
 Vasily Butusov,  Mikhail Butusov (brother)
 Dmitri Cheryshev, Denis Cheryshev (son)
 Gela Dzagoyev, Alan Dzagoev (brother)
 Vladimir Gabulov, Georgy Gabulov (brother)
 Mário Fernandes,  Jô (brother)
 Sergey Vladimirovich Grishin, Sergey Sergeyevich Grishin (son)
 Aleksandr Kerzhakov, Mikhail Kerzhakov (brother)
 Dmitry Kharine, Mikhail Kharin (brother), Filipp Kharin (nephew)
 Dmitri Khokhlov, Igor Khokhlov (son)
 Sergei Kiriakov, Yegor Kiryakov (brother)
 Dmitri Kombarov, Kirill Kombarov (twin brother)
 Alan Kusov, Artur Kusov (brother)
 Kabir Kuzyayev, Adyam Kuzyayev (son), Ruslan Kuzyayev (grandson), Daler Kuzyayev (grandson)
 Aleksei Miranchuk, Anton Miranchuk (twin brother)
 Sergei Nekrasov, Igor Nekrasov (brother)
 Viktor Onopko,  Sergei Onopko (brother)
 Viktor Panchenko, Kirill Panchenko (son)
 Pavel Pogrebnyak, Kirill Pogrebnyak (brother)
 Sergey Ryzhikov, Andrei Ryzhikov (brother)
 Andrei Semak, Sergei Semak, Nikolai Semak (brothers)
 Aleksei Smertin, Evgeny Smertin (brother)
 Vladimir Tatarchuk, Vladimir Tatarchuk, Jr. (son)
 Andrey Tikhonov, Mikhail Tikhonov (son)
 Akhrik Tsveiba, Sandro Tsveiba (son)
 Aleksei Yeryomenko,  Alexei Eremenko (son),  Roman Eremenko (son),  Sergei Eremenko (son)
 Leonid Zolkin, Pavel Zolkin (brother)

San Marino 
 Manuel Battistini, Michael Battistini (brother)
 Pierluigi Benedettini, Simone Benedettini (son), Elia Benedettini (nephew)
 Gianluca Bollini, Fabio Bollini (brother)
 Alessandro Brighi,  Matteo Brighi,  Marco Brighi,  Andrea Brighi (brothers)
 Alex Gasperoni, Bryan Gasperoni (brother)
 Enrico Golinucci, Alessandro Golinucci (brother)
 Mauro Marani, Michele Marani (brother)
 Paolo Mazza, Marco Mazza (brother)
 Danilo Rinaldi, Federico Rinaldi (brother) (see  Cristian Menin)
 Aldo Simoncini, Davide Simoncini (twin brother)
 Fabio Tomassini, David Tomassini (brother)
 Fabio Vitaioli, Matteo Vitaioli (brother)

Scotland

Serbia

Slovakia 
 David Depetris,  Rodrigo Depetris (brother)
 Albert Rusnák Sr., Albert Rusnák Jr. (son)
 Jozef Jajcaj, Ľubor Jajcaj (son), Noel Jajcaj (grandson of Jozef & son of Ľubor)

Slovenia

Soviet Union 
 Sergei Pavlovich Baltacha,  Sergei Baltacha, Jr. (son)
 Viktor Chanov, Sr., Vyacheslav Chanov (son), Viktor Chanov (son)
 Anatoli Davydov,  Dmitri Davydov (son)
 Grigory Fedotov, Vladimir Fedotov (son)
 Valery Gazzaev, Yuri Gazzaev (cousin)
 Nodar Khizanishvili,  Zurab Khizanishvili (son)
 Vladimir Kozlov,  Aleksei Kozlov (son)
 Viktor Kuznetsov, Sergei Kuznetsov (brother)
 Evgeny Lovchev,  Evgeniy Lovchev (son)
 Volodymyr Malyhin,  Aleksandr Malygin,  Yuriy Malyhin (sons)
 Aleksandr Novikov,  Kirill Novikov (son)
 Hennadiy Perepadenko, Serhiy Perepadenko (brother)
 Valeriy Petrakov,  Yuri Petrakov (son)
 Nikolai Savichev, Yuri Savichev (twin brother),  Daniil Savichev (son)
 Viktor Shustikov,  Sergey Shustikov (son),  Sergei Shustikov Jr. (grandson)
 Lev Yashin,  Vasili Frolov (grandson)

Spain

Sweden 

 Mauricio Albornoz,  Miiko Albornoz (brother)
 Roy Andersson, Patrik Andersson (son), Daniel Andersson (son)
 Hans Andersson-Tvilling, Stig Andersson-Tvilling (twin brother)
 Ludwig Augustinsson, Jonathan Augustinsson (brother)
 Karl-Gunnar Björklund, Joachim Björklund (son), Kalle Björklund
 Johan Dahlin, Erik Dahlin (brother)
 Jimmy Durmaz, David Durmaz, Sharbel Touma (relatives)
 David Elm, Viktor Elm (brother), Rasmus Elm (brother)
 Magnus Erlingmark, August Erlingmark (son)
 Hans Eskilsson, Malin Swedberg (wife), Williot Swedberg (son of Eskilsson and Swedberg)
 Jesper Ferm, Martin Ferm, Martin Ferm (cousins)
 Samuel Gustafson, Simon Gustafson (twin brother)
 Kristin Hammarström, Marie Hammarström (twin sister)
 Samuel Holmén, Sebastian Holmén (brother)
 Tord Holmgren, Tommy Holmgren (brother)
 Glenn Hysén, Tobias Hysén (son), Alexander Hysén (son),  Anton Hysén (son)
 Sebastian Jacobsson, Tobias Jacobsson (brother)
 Karl-Alfred Jacobsson, Frank Jacobsson (brother)
 Conny Karlsson, Jerry Carlsson (twin brother)
 Imad Khalili, Abdul Khalili, Moustafa Zeidan (cousins)
 Ove Kindvall, Niclas Kindvall (son)
 Ajsel Kujović, Emir Kujović (brother)
 Henrik Larsson, Jordan Larsson (son)
 Daniel Larsson, Sam Larsson (brother)
 Anders Linderoth, Tobias Linderoth (son)
 Jesper Ljunggren, Jonathan Ljunggren (brother)
 Frderik Martinsson, Mikael Martinsson (brother)
 Jim Nildén, David Nildén (son), Amanda Nildén (Jim's granddaughter, David's daughter)
 Per Nilsson, Joakim Nilsson (brother)
 Bertil Nordahl, Knut Nordahl (brother), Gunnar Nordahl (brother), Göran Nordahl (brother), Gösta Nordahl (brother), Thomas Nordahl (nephew/Gunnar's son)
 Joakim Olsson, Martin Olsson (brother)
 Marcus Olsson, Martin Olsson (twin brother)
 Rade Prica, Tim Prica (son)
 Andreas Ravelli, Thomas Ravelli (twin brother)
 Maic Sema, Ken Sema (brother)
 Johan Sundqvist, Jonathan Sundqvist (brother)
 Gary Sundgren, Daniel Sundgren (son)
 Stig Svensson, Tommy Svensson (son), Joachim Björklund (great-grandson) Kalle Björklund (great-great-grandson)
 Jonas Thern, Simon Thern (son)

Switzerland 

 Jean Abegglen, Max Abegglen, André Abegglen (brothers)
 Martin Andermatt, Nicolas Andermatt (son)
 Roman Bürki, Marco Bürki (brother)
 Pierre-Albert Chapuisat, Stéphane Chapuisat (son)
 David Degen, Philipp Degen (twin brother)
 Nico Elvedi, Jan Elvedi (twin brother)
 Alessandro Frigerio, Roberto Frigerio (son)
 Alexander Frei, Stefan Frei (second-cousin)
 Ertan Irizik, Murat Yakin, Hakan Yakin (stepbrothers)
 Simon Lustenberger, Fabian Lustenberger (brother)
 Nedim Omeragić, Bećir Omeragić (cousin)
 Roberto Rodríguez, Ricardo Rodríguez, Francisco Rodríguez (brothers)
 Christian Schwegler, Pirmin Schwegler (brother)
 Coumba Sow, Djibril Sow (cousin)
 Alain Sutter, René Sutter (brother), Nicola Sutter (nephew/René's son)
 Johan Vonlanthen,  Henry Acosta (brother)
 Max Weiler, Walter Weiler (brother)

Turkey 
 Ayhan Akman, Ali Akman (nephew)
 Mustafa Altıntaş, Yaşar Altıntaş (son), Yusuf Altıntaş (son), Batuhan Altıntaş (grandson, son of Yusuf)
 Hamit Altıntop, Halil Altıntop (twin brother)
 Ogün Altıparmak, Batur Altıparmak (son)
 Ali Artuner, Cenk Gönen (nephew)
 Fuat Buruk, Okan Buruk (brother)
 Hakan Çalhanoğlu, Muhammed Çalhanoğlu (brother),  Kerim Çalhanoğlu (cousin)
 Tolga Ciğerci, Tolcay Ciğerci (brother)
 Tanju Çolak, Yücel Çolak (brother)
 Ali Kemal Denizci, Osman Denizci (brother)
 Bülent Eken, Reha Eken (brother)
 Nail Elmastaşoğlu, Ayhan Elmastaşoğlu, Ayfer Elmastaşoğlu (brothers)
 Mehmet Ali Has, Şeref Has (brother)
 Muzzy Izzet,  Kemal Izzet (brother) 
 Reşit Kaynak, İrfan Kaynak, Kayhan Kaynak, Ayhan Kaynak, Orhan Kaynak, İlhan Kaynak (brothers)
 Bülent Korkmaz, Mert Korkmaz (brother)
 İsmail Kurt, Metin Kurt (brother)
 Serdar Kurtuluş, Serkan Kurtuluş (brother)
 Ersen Martin,  Erkan Martin
 Erhan Önal,  Patrick Mölzl (son)
 Gökmen Özdenak, Yasin Özdenak (brother), Doğan Özdenak (brother)
 Coşkun Şahinkaya, Bülent Şahinkaya, Güngör Şahinkaya (brothers)
 Hasan Kamil Sporel, Zeki Rıza Sporel (brother)
 Serdar Topraktepe, Ömer Topraktepe (brother)
 Mesut Ünal, Enes Ünal (son)
 Murat Yıldırım,  Atilla Yıldırım (brother)
 Fikret Yılmaz, Burak Yılmaz (son)
 Semih Yuvakuran, Utku Yuvakuran (son)

Ukraine 

 Oleksandr Bondarenko,  Roman Bondarenko (twin brother), Taras Bondarenko (nephew, son of Roman)
 Oleksandr Pomazun,  Ilya Pomazun (son)

Wales 

 Ivor Allchurch, Len Allchurch (brother)
 Paul Bodin, Billy Bodin (son)
 Jason Bowen, Sam Bowen (son)
 John Charles, Mel Charles (brother), Jeremy Charles (nephew), Jake Charles (grandson of John)
 David Cotterill, Joel Cotterill (cousin)
 Ryan Giggs, Rhodri Giggs (brother)
 Terry Hennessey, Wayne Hennessey (cousin)
 Frank Jackett, Kenny Jackett (son)
 Ken Leek,  Karl Darlow (grandson)
 Donato Nardiello,  Gerry Nardiello (brother), Daniel Nardiello (son)
 Chris Pike, Gareth Bale (nephew)
 Ian Rush, Owen Beck (great-nephew)
 Peter Rodon, Chris Rodon (son), Joe Rodon (grandson, nephew of Chris)
 Dean Saunders, Callum Saunders (son)
 Robbie Savage, Charlie Savage (son)
 David Thomson, George Thomson (brother)
 John Toshack, Cameron Toshack (son)
 Mike Walker,  Ian Walker (son)
 Eric Young,  Paul Ince (cousin),  Clayton Ince (cousin),  Tom Ince (cousin/Paul's son),  Rohan Ince (nephew)

Yugoslavia

References 

Lists of association football families